Sir Mark David John Warby PC (born 10 October 1958), styled The Rt Hon. Lord Justice Warby, is a Lord Justice of Appeal.

Career 

He was educated at Bristol Grammar School and St John's College, Oxford.

He was called to the bar at Gray's Inn in 1981, and appointed Queen's Counsel in 2002. He was a Recorder of the Crown Court (Midland Circuit) from 2009 to 2014. He was selected to present a seminar on media law to the Leveson Inquiry Panel in 2011. In 2013, he was appointed a Deputy High Court Judged and he became a judge of the High Court of Justice (Queen's Bench Division) on 11 June 2014. Following his appointment to the High Court he was awarded the customary knighthood.

In March 2017 he was appointed Judge in Charge of the Media and Communications List.

In March 2018 he was appointed Director of Senior Judiciary Training.

In January 2019 he became Chair of the High Court Judges’ Association.

In July 2020 his appointment to the Court of Appeal was announced, and took effect on 3 February 2021.

Publications 

 The Law of Privacy and the Media: joint editor of second and third editions and a contributor to all three editions.
 Contributor to Blackstone's Guide to the Defamation Act
 Contributor to Sport: Law and Practice
 Gave The Thomas Sutton Lecture 2019 at the Charterhouse on the subject of More and more: law and the Charterhouse in London

Honours
 He was appointed a Queen's Counsel (QC) on 16 April 2002.
 He was knighted in June 2014. This allowed him to be referred to as Sir Mark Warby.
 He was sworn in as a member of  Her Majesty's Most Honourable Privy Council on 10 March 2021 at Windsor Castle. This gave him the Honorific Prefix "The Right Honourable" for Life.

References

1958 births
Living people
People educated at Bristol Grammar School
Alumni of St John's College, Oxford
Lords Justices of Appeal
Members of Gray's Inn
Members of the Privy Council of the United Kingdom
Queen's Bench Division judges
Knights Bachelor
English King's Counsel